Max Fala is a Samoan rugby league footballer who represented Saoma at the 2000 World Cup.

Playing career
A Northcote Tigers player in the Auckland Rugby League competition, Fala was selected for the Samoa side in 2000 for the World Cup. He played in three matches for Samoa, coming off the bench.

References

Living people
Samoan rugby league players
Samoa national rugby league team players
Northcote Tigers players
Year of birth missing (living people)